The Nyanyembe (Swahili: Kabila la Nyanyembe)  are a tribe of the Nyamwezi people of northern Tanzania.

Ethnic groups in Tanzania
Indigenous peoples of East Africa